Andrés José Carevic Ghelfi (born 13 December 1978) is an Argentine professional football manager and former player who currently serves as the manager of Costa Rican club Liga Deportiva Alajuelense. He is of Croatian descent and holds a Mexican citizenship.

Club career
Carevic played in the Primera Division A for many years with teams like Potros Marte and Acapulco F.C. In 2006, he moved to Bolivia where he made appearances for first division clubs Blooming and The Strongest. In 2007, he came to Atlante as the 5th foreign player (Teams in the Mexican League are only allowed 5 foreign players). Carevic eventually acquired Mexican nationality, and has been an Atlante mainstay ever since.

He won the national championship with the club during the Apertura 2007 tournament.

Honours

Player
Atlante F.C.
Primera División de México: Apertura 2007
CONCACAF Champions League: 2008–09

Manager
Alajuelense
Liga FPD: 2020–21
CONCACAF League: 2020

References

External links
 
 

1978 births
Living people
Argentine people of Croatian descent
Argentine emigrants to Mexico
Naturalized citizens of Mexico
Mexican people of Croatian descent
Association football defenders
Argentine footballers
Mexican footballers
Chapulineros de Oaxaca footballers
Atlante F.C. footballers
C.F. Mérida footballers
General Paz Juniors footballers
Club Blooming players
The Strongest players
Comisión de Actividades Infantiles footballers
Venados F.C. players
Liga MX players
Mineros de Zacatecas managers
Argentine expatriate footballers
Expatriate footballers in Bolivia
Argentine expatriate sportspeople in Bolivia
Argentine football managers
Footballers from Santa Fe, Argentina